Freedom of the press in the United States is legally protected by the First Amendment to the United States Constitution.

History

Thirteen Colonies 

In the Thirteen Colonies before the signing of the Declaration of Independence, the newspapers and the works produced by printing presses in general was subject to a series of regulations. British authorities attempted to prohibit the publication and circulation of information of which they did not approve, and often levied charges of sedition and libel as a means of controlling printing presses.

One of the earliest cases concerning freedom of the press occurred in 1734. In a libel case against The New York Weekly Journal publisher John Peter Zenger by British governor William Cosby, Zenger was acquitted and the publication continued until 1751. At that time, there were only two newspapers in New York City and the second was not critical of Cosby's government.

U.S. Constitution 

The First Amendment permits information, ideas and opinions without interference, constraint or prosecution by the government. It was adopted on December 15, 1791, as one of the ten amendments that constitute the Bill of Rights.

Early federal laws 

In 1798, eleven years after adoption of the Constitution and seven years after ratification of the First Amendment, the governing Federalist Party attempted to stifle criticism with the Alien and Sedition Acts. According to the Sedition Act, criticism of Congress or the president (but not the vice-president) was a crime; Thomas Jefferson, a Democratic-Republican, was vice-president when the act was passed. These restrictions on the press were very unpopular, leading to the party's reduction to minority status after 1801, and eventual dissolution in 1824. Jefferson, who vehemently opposed the acts, was elected president in 1800 and pardoned most of those convicted under them. In his March 4, 1801 inaugural address, he reiterated his longstanding commitment to freedom of speech and of the press: "If there be any among us who would wish to dissolve this Union or to change its republican form, let them stand undisturbed as monuments of the safety with which error of opinion may be tolerated where reason is left free to combat it."

19th century 

In mid-August 1861, four New York City newspapers (the New York Daily News, The Journal of Commerce, the Day Book and the New York Freeman’s Journal) were given a presentment by a U.S. Circuit Court grand jury for "frequently encouraging the rebels by expressions of sympathy and agreement". This began a series of federal prosecutions during the Civil War of northern U.S. newspapers which expressed sympathy for Southern causes or criticized the Lincoln administration. Lists of "peace newspapers", published in protest by the New York Daily News, were used to plan retributions. The Bangor Democrat in Maine, was one of these newspapers; assailants believed part of a covert Federal raid destroyed the press and set the building ablaze. These actions followed executive orders issued by President Abraham Lincoln; his August 7, 1861 order made it illegal (punishable by death) to conduct "correspondence with" or give "intelligence to the enemy, either directly or indirectly".

20th century

World War I 
The Espionage Act of 1917 and the Sedition Act of 1918, which amended it, imposed restrictions on the press during wartime. The acts imposed a fine of $10,000 and up to 20 years' imprisonment for those publishing "... disloyal, profane, scurrilous, or abusive language about the form of government of the United States, or the Constitution of the United States, or the military or naval forces of the United States, or the flag ..." In Schenck v. United States (1919) the Supreme Court upheld the laws, setting the "clear and present danger" standard. Brandenburg v. Ohio (1969) revised the clear-and-present-danger test to the significantly less-restrictive "imminent lawless action" test.

Near v. Minnesota 

The 1931 U.S. Supreme Court decision Near v. Minnesota recognized freedom of the press by roundly rejecting prior restraints on publication, a principle that applied to free speech generally in subsequent jurisprudence. The court ruled that a Minnesota law targeting publishers of malicious or scandalous newspapers violated the First Amendment (as applied through the Fourteenth Amendment).

Branzburg v. Hayes 

Freedom of the press was described in 1972's Branzburg v. Hayes as "a fundamental personal right", not confined to newspapers and periodicals. In Lovell v. City of Griffin (1938), Chief Justice Charles Evans Hughes defined the press as "every sort of publication which affords a vehicle of information and opinion." This right has been extended to newspapers, books, plays, movies, and video games.

Associated Press v. United States

Associated Press v. United States (1945) dealt with media cooperation and consolidation. The court held that the AP violated the Sherman Antitrust Act by prohibiting the sale or proliferation of news to nonmember organizations and keeping nonmembers from joining; the AP bylaws constituted restraint of trade, and the fact that AP had not achieved a monopoly was irrelevant. The First Amendment did not excuse newspapers from the Sherman Antitrust Act. News, traded between states, counts as interstate commerce and is subject to the act. Freedom of the press from governmental interference under the First Amendment does not sanction repression of that freedom by private interests (326 U.S. 20). Justice Hugo Black wrote, "The First Amendment ... rests on the assumption that the widest possible dissemination of information from diverse and antagonistic sources is essential to the welfare of the public ... Freedom to publish is guaranteed by the Constitution, but freedom to combine to keep others from publishing is not".

New York Times Co. v. Sullivan 

In New York Times Co. v. Sullivan (1964), the Supreme Court ruled that when a publication involves a public figure, to support a suit for libel the plaintiff bears the burden of proving that the publisher acted with actual malice: knew of the inaccuracy of the statement or acted with reckless disregard of its truth.

Greenbelt Cooperative Publishing Association, Inc. v. Bresler 

In 1970, the U.S. Supreme Court ruled that a news organization couldn't be sued over the use of "rhetorical hyperbole". The usage in question was when quoting eyewitnesses, but the court ruled that, even if it hadn't, to call it libel "would subvert the most fundamental meaning of a free press".

New York Times Co. v. United States 

In 1971, the Supreme Court upheld the publication of the Pentagon Papers.

Hazelwood v. Kuhlmeier 
In Hazelwood v. Kuhlmeier (1988), the Supreme Court upheld the right of a school principal to review (and suppress) controversial articles in a school newspaper funded by the school and published in its name.

21st century 

Although it had been uncertain whether people who blog or use other social media are journalists entitled to protection by media shield laws, they are protected by the Free Speech and Free Press Clauses (neither of which differentiates between media businesses and nonprofessional speakers). This is further supported by the Supreme Court, which has refused to grant increased First Amendment protection to institutional media over other speakers; In a case involving campaign finance laws, the court rejected the "suggestion that communication by corporate members of the institutional press is entitled to greater constitutional protection than the same communication by" non-institutional-press businesses.

In United States v. Manning (2013), Chelsea Manning was found guilty of six counts of espionage for furnishing classified information to WikiLeaks.

Stop Online Piracy Act 

On October 26, 2011 the Stop Online Piracy Act, which opponents said would threaten free speech and censor the Internet, was introduced to the U.S. House of Representatives. White House Press Secretary Jay Carney said that President Obama "[would] not support legislation that reduces freedom of expression." The bill was shelved in 2012 after widespread protests.

Obsidian Finance Group, LLC v. Cox

On 2014, blogger Crystal Cox accused Obsidian and Kevin D. Padrick of corrupt and fraudulent conduct. Although the court dismissed most of Cox's blog posts as opinion, it found one post to be more factual in its assertions (and, therefore, defamatory).

It was ruled for the first time, by the Court of Appeals for the Ninth Circuit, that a blogger is entitled to the same free speech protection as a journalist and cannot be liable for defamation unless the blogger acted negligently. In the decision, journalists and bloggers are equally protected under the First Amendment because the "protections of the First Amendment do not turn on whether the defendant was a trained journalist, formally affiliated with traditional news entities, engaged in conflict-of-interest disclosure, went beyond just assembling others' writings, or tried to get both sides of a story."

Ranking and polling of United States press freedom

In 2022, the U.S. ranked 42nd in the Reporters Without Borders Press Freedom Index. This is an overall measure of freedom available to the press, including a range of factors including government censorship, control over journalistic access, and whistleblower protections. The U.S.'s ranking fell from 20th in 2010 to 49th in 2015, before recovering to 41st in 2016.

According to Reporters Without Borders the United States ranks behind most other Western nations for press freedom, but ahead of most Asian, African and South American countries.

Freedom House, a U.S.-based watchdog organization, ranked the United States 30th out of 197 countries in press freedom in 2014. Its report praised the constitutional protections given American journalists and criticized authorities for placing undue limits on investigative reporting in the name of national security. Freedom House gives countries a score out of 100, with 0 the most free and 100 the least free. The score is broken down into three separately-weighted categories: legal (out of 30), political (out of 40) and economic (out of 30). The United States scored 6, 10, and 5, respectively, that year for a cumulative score of 21.

In a Pew Research survey of 11,889 U.S. journalists conducted from February 16 to March 17, 2022, 57% stated that they were "extremely" or "very" concerned about the prospect of press restrictions being imposed in the United States.

U.S. Press Freedom Tracker

The U.S. Press Freedom Tracker documents press freedom violations in the United States.

The tracker was founded in 2017 and was developed from funds donated by the Committee to Protect Journalists. It is led by the Freedom of the Press Foundation and a group of organizations. Its purpose is "to provide reliable, easy-to-access information on the number of press freedom violations in the United States – from journalists facing chargers to reporters stopped at the U.S. border or asked to hand over their electronics."

The database is supported by a steering committee of Committee to Protect Journalists and twenty press freedom groups. It was developed to document the increasing rate of assaults, seizures of equipment, arrests, and stops at the border. It tracks the type of law enforcement—local, state, and the National Guard—and the nationality of the journalists. The tracker is maintained and findings are published by the Freedom of the Press Foundation.

Violence against journalists in the U.S. 

According to the U.S. Press Freedom Tracker, in 2020, approximately 300 journalists were assaulted in the U.S. (primarily by law enforcement) and at least 110 were arrested or criminally charged in relation to their reporting.

On September 3, 2022, investigative journalist Jeff German of the Las Vegas Review-Journal was stabbed to death outside his home. Police arrested a government official who was the subject of German's reporting for the murder.

See also 

 Free Flow of Information Act
 Freedom of speech in the United States
 Photography Is Not a Crime
 Reporter's privilege
 Shield laws in the United States

References

Sources

Further reading
 
 Epps, Garrett and David B. Oppenheimer. Freedom of the Press: The First Amendment: Its Constitutional History and the Contemporary Debate (2008)
 Martin, Robert W.T. The Free and Open Press: The Founding of American Democratic Press Liberty, 1640–1800 (2012).
 Nelson, Harold Lewis, ed. Freedom of the Press from Hamilton to the Warren Court (Bobbs-Merrill Company, 1967)
 Powe, Lucas A.  The Fourth Estate and the Constitution: Freedom of the Press in America (Univ of California Press, 1992)
 Ross, Gary. Who Watches the Watchmen?: The Conflict Between National Security and Freedom of the Press (2015)

United States
American journalism
Human rights in the United States